Ensenada Partido is a district (a "partido") of Buenos Aires Province, Argentina, belonging to the Greater La Plata area, just south of the Gran Buenos Aires urban conglomerate.

History 
The district spans the area historically known as Ensenada de Barragán (Barragán's Cove). The old coastal site forms part of what is today Santiago Island. A military battery and defensive wall was built there in the early 18th century, known as Fuerte Barragán (Fort Barragán). On 5 May 1801 Viceroy Marqués de Avilés founded the village of Ensenada.  In 1882, the government of Dardo Rocha declared it as temporary provincial capital while the new city of La Plata was being built.

Settlements
Ensenada
Punta Lara
Villa Catella
Dique Nº 1
Isla Santiago

External links

 
 Information about Ensenada

Partidos of Buenos Aires Province
La Plata